Come Home may refer to:

Albums 
 Come Home (Annbjørg Lien and Bjørn Ole Rasch album) or the title song, 2009
 Come Home (Luminate album) or the title song, 2011
 Come Home (video), a 2008 video album by The Feeling

Songs 
 "Come Home" (IAMX song), 2013
 "Come Home" (James song), 1989
 "Come Home" (OneRepublic song), 2009, covered by Faith Hill (2011)
 "Come Home" (Placebo song), 1996
 "(I Want to) Come Home", by Paul McCartney, 2009
 "Come Home", by Anderson Paak from Ventura
 "Come Home", by Antix
 "Come Home", by The Dismemberment Plan from Change
 "Come Home", by Emyli
 "Come Home", by Freddy Mullins
 "Come Home", by OceanLab from Sirens of the Sea
 "Come Home", by Trace Adkins from Chrome

Other uses 
 Come Home (TV series), a 2018 BBC TV series starring Christopher Eccleston
 Come Home, a 2012 novel by Lisa Scottoline

See also 
 Come Back Home (disambiguation)
 Come On Home (disambiguation)
 Coming Home (disambiguation)